Martil (Berber: ⵎⴰⵔⵜⵉⵍ) is a town in Tanger-Tetouan-Al Hoceima, Morocco. It is located on the Mediterranean Sea northeast of Tetouan.

The name Martil comes from the Spanish name of Río Martín at the time of the Spanish protectorate of Northern Morocco. To the north is the golfing resort of Cabo Negro.

References

Populated places in M'diq-Fnideq Prefecture
Seaside resorts in Morocco